African elephants (Loxodonta) are a genus comprising two living elephant species, the African bush elephant (L. africana) and the smaller African forest elephant (L. cyclotis). Both are social herbivores with grey skin, but differ in the size and colour of their tusks and in the shape and size of their ears and skulls.

Both species are considered at heavy risk of extinction on the IUCN Red List; as of 2021, the bush elephant is considered endangered and the forest elephant is considered critically endangered. They are threatened by habitat loss and fragmentation, and poaching for the illegal ivory trade is a threat in several range countries as well.

Loxodonta is one of two extant genera of the family Elephantidae. The name refers to the lozenge-shaped enamel of their molar teeth. Fossil remains of Loxodonta species have been excavated in Africa, dating to the Middle Pliocene.

Taxonomy

The first scientific description of the African elephant was written in 1797 by Johann Friedrich Blumenbach, who proposed the scientific name Elephas africanus.
Loxodonte was proposed as a generic name for the African elephant by Frédéric Cuvier in 1825. This name refers to the lozenge-shaped enamel of the molar teeth, which differs significantly from the rounded shape of the Asian elephant's molar enamel.
An anonymous author used the Latinized spelling Loxodonta in 1827. Anonymous was recognized as authority by the International Code of Zoological Nomenclature in 1999.

Elephas (Loxodonta) cyclotis was proposed by Paul Matschie in 1900, who described three African elephant zoological specimens from Cameroon whose skulls differed in shape from elephant skulls collected elsewhere in Africa. In 1936, Glover Morrill Allen considered this elephant to be a distinct species and called it 'forest elephant'; later authors considered it to be a subspecies. Morphological and genetic analyses provided evidence for species-level differences between the African bush elephant and the African forest elephant.

In 1907, Richard Lydekker proposed six African elephant subspecies based on the different sizes and shapes of their ears. They are all considered synonymous with the African bush elephant.

A third species, the West African elephant, has also been proposed but it needs confirmation. It is thought that this lineage has been isolated from the others for 2.4 million years.

Extinct African elephants 
Between the late 18th and 21st centuries, the following extinct African elephants were described on the basis of fossil remains:
North African elephant (Loxodonta africana pharaohensis) proposed by Paulus Edward Pieris Deraniyagala in 1948 was a specimen from Fayum in Egypt.
 Loxodonta atlantica was proposed as Elephas atlanticus by Auguste Pomel in 1879 based on a skull and bones found in Ternifine, Algeria.
 Loxodonta exoptata proposed by Wilhelm Otto Dietrich in 1941 was based on teeth found in Laetoli, Tanzania.
 Loxodonta adaurora proposed by Vincent Maglio in 1970 was a complete skeleton found in Kanapoi, Kenya.
 Loxodonta cookei proposed by William J. Sanders in 2007 based on teeth found in the Varswater Formation at Langebaanweg, South Africa.

Phylogeny 
Analysis of nuclear DNA sequences indicates that the genetic divergence between African bush and forest elephants dates 2.6 – 5.6 million years ago. The divergence between the Asian elephant and the woolly mammoths is estimated 2.5 – 5.4 million years ago, which strongly supports their status as distinct species. The African forest elephant was found to have a high degree of genetic diversity, perhaps reflecting periodic fragmentation of their habitat during the climatic changes in the Pleistocene.

Gene flow between the two African elephant species was examined at 21 locations. The analysis revealed that several African bush elephants carried mitochondrial DNA of African forest elephants, indicating they hybridised in the savanna-forest transition zone in ancient times.

Sequence analysis of DNA from fossils of the extinct Eurasian Palaeoloxodon antiquus shows it to be much closer related to the African forest elephant than to the African bush elephant. The validity of Palaeoloxodon has therefore been questioned.

Description

Skin, ears, and trunk 

Short tactile hair grows on the trunk, which has two finger-like processes at the tip, whereas Asian elephants only have one. Their large ears help to reduce body heat; flapping them creates air currents and exposes the ears' inner sides where large blood vessels increase heat loss during hot weather. The trunk is a prehensile elongation of its upper lip and nose. This highly sensitive organ is innervated primarily by the trigeminal nerve, and thought to be manipulated by about 40,000–60,000 muscles. Because of this muscular structure, the trunk is so strong that elephants can use it for lifting about 3% of their own body weight. They use it for smelling, touching, feeding, drinking, dusting, producing sounds, loading, defending and attacking. Elephants sometimes swim underwater and use their trunks as snorkels.

Tusks and molars 
Both male and female African elephants have tusks that grow from deciduous teeth called tushes, which are replaced by tusks when calves are about one year old. Tusks are composed of dentin, which forms small diamond-shaped structures in the tusk's center that become larger at its periphery. Tusks are primarily used to dig for roots and strip the bark from trees for food, for fighting each other during mating season, and for defending themselves against predators. They are curved forward and continue to grow throughout the elephant's lifetime.

As the front pair wears down and drops out in pieces, the back pair moves forward, and two new molars emerge in the back of the mouth. Elephants replace their teeth four to six times in their lifetimes. At around 40 to 60 years of age, the elephant loses the last of its molars and will likely die of starvation which is a common cause of death. African elephants have 24 teeth in total, six on each quadrant of the jaw. The enamel plates of the molars are fewer in number than in Asian elephants.

Size 
The African bush elephant is the largest terrestrial animal. Its back is concave-shaped, while the back of the African forest elephant is nearly straight.

It is the third largest terrestrial animal.

Distribution and habitat 

African elephants are distributed in Sub-Saharan Africa, where they inhabit Sahelian scrubland and arid regions, tropical rainforests, mopane and miombo woodlands. African forest elephant populations occur only in Central Africa.

Behavior and ecology

Sleeping pattern
Elephants are the animals with the lowest sleep times, especially African elephants. Their average sleep was found to be only 2 hours in 24-hour cycles.

Family 

Both African elephant species live in family units comprising several adult cows, their daughters and their subadult sons. Each family unit is led by an older cow known as the matriarch. African forest elephant groups are less cohesive than African bush elephant groups, probably because of the lack of predators.

When separate family units bond, they form kinship or bond groups. After puberty, male elephants tend to form close alliances with other males. While females are the most active members of African elephant groups, both male and female elephants are capable of distinguishing between hundreds of different low frequency infrasonic calls to communicate with and identify each other.

Elephants use some vocalisations that are beyond the hearing range of humans, to communicate across large distances. Elephant mating rituals include the gentle entwining of trunks.

The bulls were believed to be solitary animals, becoming independent once reaching maturity. New research suggests that bulls maintain ecological knowledge for the herd, facilitating survival when searching for food and water, which also benefits the young bulls who associate with them. Bulls only return to the herd to breed or to socialize; they do not provide prenatal care to their offspring, but rather play a fatherly role to younger bulls to show dominance.

Feeding 
While feeding, the African elephant uses its trunk to pluck leaves and its tusk to tear at branches, which can cause enormous damage to foliage. Fermentation of the food takes place in the hindgut, thus enabling large food intakes. The large size and hindgut of the African elephant also allows for digestion of various plant parts, including fibrous stems, bark and roots.

Intelligence 

African elephants are highly intelligent. They have a very large and highly convoluted neocortex, a trait they share with humans, apes and some dolphin species. They are amongst the world's most intelligent species. The elephant's brain is similar to a human brain in terms of structure and complexity; the elephant's cortex has as many neurons as that of a human brain, suggesting convergent evolution.

Elephants exhibit a wide variety of behaviours, including those associated with grief, learning, mimicry, art, play, a sense of humor, altruism, use of tools, compassion, cooperation, self-awareness, memory and possibly language. All of these behaviors point to a highly intelligent species that is thought to be equal with cetaceans and primates.

Reproduction 
African elephants are at their most fertile between the ages of 25 and 45. Calves are born after a gestation period of up to nearly two years. The calves are cared for by their mother and other young females in the group, known as allomothering.

African elephants show sexual dimorphism in weight and shoulder height by age 20, due to the rapid early growth of males. By age 25, males are double the weight of females; however, both sexes continue to grow throughout their lives.

Female African elephants are able to start reproducing at around 10 to 12 years of age, and are in estrus for about 2 to 7 days. They do not mate at a specific time; however, they are less likely to reproduce in times of drought than when water is plentiful. The gestation period of an elephant is 22 months and fertile females usually give birth every 3–6 years, so if they live to around 50 years of age, they may produce 7 offspring. Females are a scarce and mobile resource for the males so there is intense competition to gain access to estrous females.

Post sexual maturity, males begin to experience musth, a physical and behavioral condition that is characterized by elevated testosterone, aggression and more sexual activity. Musth also serves a purpose of calling attention to the females that they are of good quality, and it cannot be mimicked as certain calls or noises may be. Males sire few offspring in periods when they are not in musth. During the middle of estrus, female elephants look for males in musth to guard them. The females will yell, in a loud, low way to attract males from far away. Male elephants can also smell the hormones of a female ready for breeding. This leads males to compete with each other to mate, which results in the females mating with older, healthier males. Females choose to a point who they mate with, since they are the ones who try to get males to compete to guard them. However, females are not guarded in the early and late stages of estrus, which may permit mating by younger males not in musth.

Males over the age of 25 compete strongly for females in estrus, and are more successful the larger and more aggressive they are. Bigger males tend to sire bigger offspring. Wild males begin breeding in their thirties when they are at a size and weight that is competitive with other adult males. Male reproductive success is maximal in mid-adulthood and then begins to decline. However, this can depend on the ranking of the male within their group, as higher-ranking males maintain a higher rate of reproduction. Most observed matings are by males in musth over 35 years of age. Twenty-two long observations showed that age and musth are extremely important factors; "… older males had markedly elevated paternity success compared with younger males, suggesting the possibility of sexual selection for longevity in this species."

Males usually stay with a female and her herd for about a month before moving on in search of another mate. Less than a third of the population of female elephants will be in estrus at any given time and the gestation period of an elephant is long, so it makes more evolutionary sense for a male to search for as many females as possible rather than stay with one group.

Threats 

Both species are threatened by habitat loss and fragmentation, and poaching for the illegal ivory trade is a threat in several range countries as well. The African bush elephant is listed as Endangered and the African forest elephant as Critically Endangered on the respective IUCN Red Lists.

Based on vegetation types that provide suitable habitat for African elephants, it was estimated that in the early 19th century a maximum of 26,913,000 African elephants might have been present from the Sahel in the north to the Highveld in the south. Decrease of suitable habitat was the major cause for the decline of elephant populations until the 1950s. Hunting African elephants for the ivory trade accelerated the decline from the 1970s onwards. The carrying capacity of remaining suitable habitats was estimated at 8,985,000 elephants at most by 1987.
In the 1970s and 1980s, the price for ivory rose, and poaching for ivory increased in particular in Central African range countries where access to elephant habitats was facilitated by logging and petroleum mining industries.
Between 1976 and 1980, about  raw ivory was exported from Africa to Hong Kong and Japan, equivalent to tusks of about 222,000 African elephants.

The first continental elephant census was carried out in 1976.
In the 1980s, it was difficult to carry out systematic surveys in several East African range countries due to civil wars.
In 1987, it was estimated that the African elephant population had declined to 760,000 individuals. In 1989, only 608,000 African elephants were estimated to have survived.
In 1989, the Kenyan Wildlife Service burned a stockpile of tusks in protest against the ivory trade.

When the international ivory trade reopened in 2006, the demand and price for ivory increased in Asia. In Chad's Zakouma National Park, more than 3,200 elephants were killed between 2005 and 2010. The park did not have sufficient guards to combat poaching and their weapons were outdated. Well organized networks facilitated smuggling the ivory through Sudan.
The government of Tanzania estimated that more than 85,000 elephants were lost to poaching in Tanzania between 2009 and 2014, representing a 60% loss.
In 2012, a large upsurge in ivory poaching was reported, with about 70% of the product flowing to China.
China was the biggest market for poached ivory but announced that it would phase out the legal domestic manufacture and sale of ivory products in May 2015.

Conflicts between elephants and a growing human population are a major issue in elephant conservation. Human encroachment into natural areas where bush elephants occur or their increasing presence in adjacent areas has spurred research into methods of safely driving groups of elephants away from humans. Playback of the recorded sounds of angry Western honey bees has been found to be remarkably effective at prompting elephants to flee an area. Farmers have tried scaring elephants away by more aggressive means such as fire or the use of chili peppers along fences to protect their crops.

Conservation 
In 1986, the African Elephant Database was initiated with the aim to monitor the status of African elephant populations. This database includes results from aerial surveys, dung counts, interviews with local people and data on poaching.

In 1989, the Convention on International Trade in Endangered Species of Wild Fauna and Flora listed the African elephant on CITES Appendix I. This listing banned international trade of African elephants and their body parts by countries that signed the CITES agreement. Hunting elephants is banned in the Central African Republic, Democratic Republic of Congo, Gabon, Côte d'Ivoire, and Senegal. After the ban came into force in 1990, retail sales of ivory carvings in South Africa have plummeted by more than 95% within 10 years.
As a result of the trade ban, African elephant populations recovered in Southern African range countries.

The African Elephant Specialist Group has set up a Human-Elephant Conflict Task Force with the aim to develop conflict mitigation strategies.

In 2005, the West African Elephant Memorandum of Understanding was signed by 12 West African countries. The Convention on the Conservation of Migratory Species of Wild Animals provided financial support for four years to implement the West African Elephant Conservation Strategy, which forms the central component of this intergovernmental treaty.

In 2019, the export of wild African elephants to zoos around the world was banned, with an exception added by the EU to allow export in "exceptional cases where … it is considered that a transfer to ex-situ locations will provide demonstrable in-situ conservation benefits for African elephants". Previously, export had been allowed in Southern Africa with Zimbabwe capturing and exporting more than 100 baby elephants to Chinese zoos since 2012.

It was found that elephant conservation does not pose a trade-off with climate change mitigation. Although animals typically cause a reduction of woody biomass and therewith above-ground carbon, they foster soil carbon sequestration.

In culture
Many African cultures revere the African elephant as a symbol of strength and power. It is also praised for its size, longevity, stamina, mental faculties, cooperative spirit, and loyalty. Its religious importance is mostly totemic. Many societies believed that their chiefs would be reincarnated as elephants. In the 10th century, the people of Igbo-Ukwu in Nigeria buried their leaders with elephant tusks.

South Africa uses elephant tusks in their coat of arms to represent wisdom, strength, moderation and eternity.

In the western African Kingdom of Dahomey, the elephant was associated with the 19th century rulers of the Fon people, Guezo and his son Glele. The animal is believed to evoke strength, royal legacy, and enduring memory as related by the proverbs: "There where the elephant passes in the forest, one knows" and "The animal steps on the ground, but the elephant steps down with strength." Their flag depicted an elephant wearing a royal crown.

As National Symbols
The coat of arms of the Central African Republic features the head of an elephant in the upper left quadrant of the shield. The version of the coat of arms of Guinea used from 1958 to 1984 featured a golden elephant in the centre of the shield. The coat of arms of Ivory Coast features the head of an elephant as the focal point of the emblem. The coat of arms of the Republic of the Congo has two elephants supporting the shield. The coat of arms of Eswatini has an elephant and a lion supporting the shield.

See also
Africa's Elephant Kingdom
Indian elephant
List of individual elephants
Sri Lankan elephant
Sumatran elephant

Notes

References

External links 

 
 Elephant Information Repository – An in-depth resource on elephants
 "Elephant caves" of Mt Elgon National Park
 ElephantVoices – Resource on elephant vocal communications
 Amboseli Trust for Elephants – Interactive web site
 Another Elephant – A hub for saving the elephants.

 EIA 25 yrs investigating the ivory trade, reports etc
 EIA (in the USA) reports etc
 International Elephant Foundation
 
 

African elephant
Mammals of Sub-Saharan Africa
EDGE species
Animal species groups
National symbols of the Central African Republic
National symbols of Guinea
National symbols of Ivory Coast
National symbols of the Republic of the Congo
National symbols of Eswatini
Articles containing video clips
Extant Pliocene first appearances